Hirsutiidae is a family of crustaceans, classified either as a separate order, Bochusacea, or as part of a wider Mictacea. It comprises five species in three genera:
Hirsutia bathyalis Saunders, Hessler & Garner, 1985
Hirsutia saundersetalia Just & Poore, 1988
Thetispelecaris remex Gutu & Iliffe, 1998
Thetispelecaris yurigako Ohtsuka, Hanamura & Kase, 2002
Montucaris distincta Jaume, Boxshall & Bamber, 2006

See also
Mictocaris

References

Malacostraca
Crustacean families
Taxa described in 1985